Renato Soares de Oliveira Augusto (born 8 February 1988) is a Brazilian professional footballer who plays as a midfielder for Campeonato Brasileiro Série A club Corinthians. From 2011 to 2018, he played for the Brazil national team, scoring six goals in thirty-two appearances.

Club career

Flamengo
Renato was hailed as one of the best products of Flamengo's youth academy in recent years, and had been close to a deal with Palermo in 2007. His style of play, combining decisive passes with good control of the ball, pace and dribbling efforts led him to being capped for Brazil at under-20 level; his career with Flamengo had nevertheless been plagued by injuries.

Bayer Leverkusen

Renato signed for German Bundesliga club Bayer Leverkusen for an unknown fee, though thought to be €10 million, 60% of which was retained by Flamengo; the remaining 40% were owned by the Traffic and MFD investment groups, that paid €1.5 million each for a share in Renato Augusto's transfer fee, earlier in 2008.

Renato made an immediate impact, becoming one of the fan favorites very quickly with his swiftness, awareness, teamwork, and his technical abilities. Despite usually playing on the right side, with Leverkusen, he began playing in the hole, just behind the striker.

Despite being plagued with injury in the 2010–11 season, just like the previous ones in Germany, Augusto maintained stellar form, scoring on three occasions in one-goal lead victories. On 13 March, he scored a memorable goal where he scored a match-winner in 82nd minute against Mainz 05, giving Bayer Leverkusen a valuable victory, and vaulting them into the title race.

Corinthians
On 20 December 2012, Bayer Leverkusen confirmed that Renato would leave for Corinthians for a reported fee of €3.5 million. In 2014, after being properly diagnosed and treated, he played 44 games in the year, and in 2015, he was awarded the Bola de Ouro (Golden Ball) for leading Corinthians to the Campeonato Brasileiro Série A title.

Beijing Guoan
On 6 January 2016, Renato joined Chinese club Beijing Guoan for a reported fee of €8 million. On 20 April 2019, he made his 100th appearance for Beijing Guoan in a game against Hebei China Fortune.

Return to Corinthians
On 22 July 2021, Renato returned to Corinthians after rescinding his contract with Beijing.

International career

Renato debuted with the senior national team in a away friendly against France in February 2011, which Brazil lost 0-1. His 2nd game was a March 2011 friendly against Scotland, which Brazil won 2–0. He was not called up by Mano Menezes for the 2011 Copa América, but returned to the squad for a friendly against Germany in August 2011, which Brazil lost 2–3. After that, he went more than four years without playing for Brazil, missing the 2013 Confederations Cup, the 2014 World Cup and the 2015 Copa América.

Previously, he was part of the preliminary squad for the 2008 Summer Olympics, but was not included in the final 18-man squad by coach Dunga, only getting named in the standby list. He was recalled by the same Dunga, who had returned to the job after the 2014 World Cup, for the 2018 FIFA World Cup qualifiers in November 2015.

On 17 November 2015, Augusto scored his first goal for Brazil in a 3–0 victory against Peru for 2018 FIFA World Cup qualification. He was a part of the Brazilian squads at the 2016 Copa América Centenario and the 2016 Olympic Games; in the latter, Brazil won the gold medal for the first time, and in the final against Germany after a 1–1 draw, he converted his penalty kick in an eventual 5–4 win for Brazil.

Renato netted twice against Haiti during the Copa América Centenario (7–1 win for Brazil), with Brazil eventually falling out in group stage. He also scored twice more during the qualifiers, at home to Uruguay (2–2) and away to Peru (2–0 win for Brazil).

In May 2018, he was named in Tite's final 23-man squad for the 2018 World Cup in Russia. On 6 July 2018, Augusto scored Brazil's only goal in a 1–2 quarter-final defeat to Belgium as they were eliminated from the World Cup.

In June 2019, he was considered by some fans and part of the media to be one of the top contenders to take Neymar's spot in the national team ahead of the 2019 Copa América, held in Brazilian soil, after the PSG forward got injured in a friendly against Qatar, due to his previous works with coach Tite in Corinthians and the national team itself, but eventually lost out the callup to Chelsea's Willian.

Career statistics

Club
.

International

Scores and results list Brazil's goal tally first, score column indicates score after each Augusto goal.

Honours
Flamengo
 Copa do Brasil: 2006
 Campeonato Carioca: 2007, 2008

Corinthians
 Campeonato Brasileiro Série A: 2015
 Campeonato Paulista: 2013
 Recopa Sudamericana: 2013

Beijing Guoan
 Chinese FA Cup: 2018

Brazil U17
FIFA U-17 World Cup runner-up: 2005

Brazil U23
 Olympic Gold Medal: 2016

Individual
 kicker Bundesliga Team of the Season: 2008–09
 Campeonato Brasileiro Série A Best Player: 2015
 Campeonato Brasileiro Série A Team of the Year: 2015
 Bola de Ouro: 2015

References

External links

Renato Augusto at Guardian Stats Centre
A name to remember: Renato Augusto

1988 births
Living people
Brazil youth international footballers
Brazil under-20 international footballers
Brazil international footballers
Olympic footballers of Brazil
Footballers at the 2016 Summer Olympics
Olympic gold medalists for Brazil
Olympic medalists in football
Medalists at the 2016 Summer Olympics
2018 FIFA World Cup players
CR Flamengo footballers
Bayer 04 Leverkusen players
Sport Club Corinthians Paulista players
Beijing Guoan F.C. players
Footballers from Rio de Janeiro (city)
Brazilian footballers
Association football midfielders
Campeonato Brasileiro Série A players
Bundesliga players
Chinese Super League players
Copa América Centenario players
Brazilian expatriate footballers
Brazilian expatriate sportspeople in Germany
Expatriate footballers in Germany
Brazilian expatriate sportspeople in China
Expatriate footballers in China